The 2022–23 Big Ten women's basketball season began with practices in October 2022, followed by the start of the 2022–23 NCAA Division I women's basketball season in November 2022. The regular season will end in March, 2023.

Head coaches

Coaching changes prior to the season

Illinois
On March 21, 2022, Shauna Green was named the tenth head coach of Illinois.

Rutgers
On May 23, 2022, Coquese Washington was named the third full time head coach of Rutgers, following the retirement of longtime head coach C. Vivian Stringer.

Coaches

Notes: 
 All records, appearances, titles, etc. are from time with current school only. 
 Year at school includes 2022–23 season.
 Overall and Big Ten records are from time at current school and are through the beginning of the season. 
 Frese's ACC conference record excluded since Maryland began Big Ten Conference play in 2014–15.

Regular season
The 2022–23 Big Ten Network television schedule was released on September 21, 2022.

Records against other conferences
2022–23 records against non-conference opponents, as of December 22, 2022:

Regular season

Post season

Record against ranked non-conference opponents
This is a list of games against ranked opponents only (rankings from the AP Poll):

Team rankings are reflective of AP poll when the game was played, not current or final ranking

† denotes game was played on neutral site

Rankings

Awards and honors

Players of the Week 
Throughout the conference regular season, Big Ten Conference offices named two players (Player and Freshman) of the week each Monday.

All-Big Ten awards and teams
On February 28, 2023, the Big Ten announced most of its conference awards.

References